

H

Ha – He 

Haapalaite (valleriite: IMA1972-021) 2.FD.30   
Hafnon (zircon: IMA1974-018) 9.AD.30    (IUPAC: hafnium tetraoxysilicate)
Hagendorfite (alluaudite: 1954) 8.AC.10    (IUPAC: disodium manganese (iron(II) iron(III)) triphosphate)
Haggertyite (magnetoplumbite: IMA1996-054) 4.CC.45    (IUPAC: barium hexairon pentatitanium magnesium nonadecaoxide)
Häggite (Y: 1958) 4.HE.25    (IUPAC: vanadium(III) vanadium(IV) trihydro dioxide)
Hagstromite (IMA2019-093) 7.0  [no] [no]
Haidingerite (Y: 1827) 8.CJ.20    (IUPAC: calcium hydroxoarsenate monohydrate)
Haigerachite (IMA1997-049) 8.CF.10    (IUPAC: potassium triiron(III) hexa(dihydroxophosphate) di(hydroxophosphate) tetrahydrate)
Haineaultite (IMA1997-015) 9.DG.50   
Hainite-(Y) (seidozerite, rinkite: IMA2016 s.p., Y: 1893) 9.BE.22   
Haitaite-(La) (IMA2019-033a)  [no] [no]
Haiweeite (IMA1962 s.p., 1959) 9.AK.25    (IUPAC: calcium diuranyl dodecaoxypentasilicate dihydroxyl hexahydrate)
Hakite-(Hg) (tetrahedrite: IMA2018-K, IMA1970-019) 2.GB.05    (Cu6[Cu4Hg2]Sb4Se13)
Halamishite (phosphide: IMA2013-105) 1.0  [no] [no] (IUPAC: pentanickel tetraphosphide)
Håleniusite (fluorite) 3.DE.05
Håleniusite-(La) (fluorite: IMA2003-028) 3.DE.05   [no] (IUPAC: lanthanum oxofluoride)
Håleniusite-(Ce) (fluorite: IMA2021-042) 3.DE.05  [no] [no]
Halilsarpite (IMA2019-023) 8.CH.05  [no] [no]
Halite (halite, rocksalt: 1847) 3.AA.20    (IUPAC: sodium chloride)
Hallimondite (IMA1965-008) 8.EA.10    (IUPAC: dilead uranyl diarsenate (n)hydrate)
Halloysite (kaolinite: 1826) 9.ED.10   
Halotrichite (halotrichite: 1777) 7.CB.85    (IUPAC: iron(II) dialuminium tetrasulfate docosahydrate)
Halurgite (IMA1967 s.p., 1962) 6.H0.35   
Hambergite (Y: 1890) 6.AB.05    (IUPAC: diberyllium hydro borate)
Hammarite (meneghinite: 1924) 2.HB.05a    (Cu2Pb2Bi4S9)
Hanahanite (IMA2022-012) 4.E0.  [no] [no]
Hanauerite (IMA2018-045) 2.0  [no] [no] (IUPAC: silver mercury sulfide iodide)
Hanawaltite (IMA1994-036) 3.DD.15    ((Hg-Hg)3HgO3Cl2)
Hancockite (epidote, clinozoisite: IMA2006 s.p., 1899) 9.BG.05a   
Hanjiangite (IMA2009-082) 9.E?.  [no] [no]
Hanksite (Y: 1885) 7.BD.30    (IUPAC: potassium docosasodium chloro nonasulfate dicarbonate)
Hannayite (Y: 1878) 8.CH.35    (IUPAC: diammonium trimagnesium tetra(hydroxophosphate) octahydrate)
Hannebachite (IMA1983-056) 4.JE.10    (IUPAC: dicalcium sulfite monohydrate).
Hansblockite (IMA2015-103) 2.0  [no] [no]
Hansesmarkite (polyoxometalate: IMA2015-067) 4.0  [no] [no]
Hanswilkeite (IMA2022-041) 2.CB.  [no] [no]
Hapkeite (silicide: IMA2003-014) 1.BB.35    (IUPAC: diiron silicide)
Haradaite (IMA1963-011) 9.DH.15    (IUPAC: strontium vanadium(IV) heptaoxodisilicate)
Hardystonite (melilite: 1899) 9.BB.10    (IUPAC: dicalcium zinc heptaoxodisilicate)
Harkerite (Y: 1951) 6.AB.70   
Harmotome (zeolitic tectosilicate: IMA1997 s.p., 1801) 9.GC.10   
Harmunite (post-spinel: IMA2012-045) 4.0  [no] [no] (IUPAC: calcium diiron tetraoxide) 
Harrisonite (IMA1991-010) 8.AC.55    (IUPAC: calcium hexairon(II) di(tetraoxysilicate) diphosphate)
Harstigite (Y: 1886) 9.BF.05    (IUPAC: hexacalcium tetraberyllium manganese(II) di(tetraoxysilicate) di(heptaoxodisilicate) dihydroxyl)
Hasanovite (IMA2020-033)  [no] [no]
Hashemite (baryte: IMA1978-006) 7.FA.15    (IUPAC: barium chromate(VI))
Hastingsite [Ca-amphibole: IMA2012 s.p., 1896] 9.DE.15   
Hatchite (hatchite: 1912) 2.GC.05    (IUPAC: silver lead thallium diarsenide pentasulfide)
Hatertite (alluaudite: IMA2012-048) 8.0  [no] [no]
Hatrurite (Y: 1977) 9.AG.65    (IUPAC: tricalcium oxo(tetraoxysilicate))
Hauchecornite (hauchecornite: IMA1975-006a, 1893 Rd) 2.BB.10    (IUPAC: nonanickel bismuth antimonide octasulfide)
Hauckite (IMA1979-012) 7.BB.10   
Hauerite (pyrite: 1846) 2.EB.05a    (IUPAC: manganese disulfide)
Hausmannite (spinel: 1813) 4.BB.10    (IUPAC: manganese(II) dimanganese(III) tetraoxide)
Haüyne (sodalite: 1807) 9.FB.10   
Hawleyite (sphalerite: 1955) 2.CB.05a    (IUPAC: cadmium sulfide)
Hawthorneite (magnetoplumbite: IMA1988-019) 4.CC.45   
Haxonite (carbide: IMA1971-001) 1.BA.10    (IUPAC: triicosa(iron,nickel) hexacarbide)
Haycockite (chalcopyrite: IMA1971-028) 2.CB.10b    (IUPAC: tetracopper pentairon octasulfide)
Haydeeite (atacamite: IMA2006-046) 3.DA.10c    (IUPAC: tricopper magnesium hexahydro dichloride)
Haynesite (IMA1990-023) 4.JJ.25    (IUPAC: triuranyl dihydro disulfite pentahydrate)
Haywoodite (IMA2021-115)
Hazenite (IMA2007-061) 8.CH.40   [no] (IUPAC: potassium sodium dimagnesium diphosphate tetradecahydrate)
Heamanite-(Ce) (IMA2020-001) 4.0  [no] [no]
Heazlewoodite (Y: 1897) 2.BB.05    (IUPAC: trinickel disulfide)
Hechtsbergite (atelestite: IMA1995-050) 8.BO.15    (IUPAC: dibismuth hydro oxovanadate)
Hectorfloresite (IMA1987-050a) 7.BD.60    (IUPAC: nonasodium iodate tetrasulfate)
HectoriteQ (montmorillonite, smectite: 1941) 9.EC.45   
Hedegaardite (whitlockite: IMA2014-069) 8.0  [no] [no]
Hedenbergite (pyroxene: IMA1988 s.p., 1819) 9.DA.15    (IUPAC: calcium iron(II) hexaoxydisilicate)
Hedleyite (tetradymite: 1945) 2.DC.05    (IUPAC: heptabismuth tritelluride)
Hedyphane (apatite: IMA1980 s.p., 1830) 8.BN.05    (IUPAC: dicalcium trilead chloro triarsenate)
Heftetjernite (wolframite: IMA2006-056) 4.DB.30    (IUPAC: scandium tantalum tetraoxide)
Heideite (IMA1973-062) 2.DA.15   
Heidornite (Y: 1956) 6.EC.30   
Heinrichite (Y: 1958) 8.EB.05    (IUPAC: barium diuranyl diarsenate decahydrate)
Heisenbergite (IMA2010-076) 4.GA.  [no] [no] (IUPAC: uranyl dihydroxide monohydrate)
Hejtmanite (seidozerite, bafertisite: IMA1989-038) 9.BE.55   
Heklaite (fluorosilicate: IMA2008-052) 3.0    (IUPAC: potassium sodium hexafluorosilicate)
Hellandite 9.DK.20
Hellandite-(Ce) (IMA2001-019) 9.DK.20   [no]
Hellandite-(Y) (IMA2000-F, 1903) 9.DK.20   
Hellyerite (IMA1962 s.p., 1959) 5.CA.20    (IUPAC: nickel carbonate hexahydrate)
Helmutwinklerite (tsumcorite: IMA1979-010) 8.CG.20    (IUPAC: lead dizinc diarsenate dihydrate)
Helvine (sodalite: 1804) 9.FB.10    (IUPAC: triberyllium tetramanganese(II) tri(tetraoxysilicate) sulfide)
Hematite (corundum: IMA1971 s.p., 1546) 4.CB.05    (IUPAC: diiron trioxide)
Hematolite (hematolite: 1884) 8.BE.45   
Hematophanite (perovskite: 1928) 3.DB.35   
Hemihedrite (iranite: IMA1967-011) 7.FC.15    (IUPAC: zinc decalead hexachromate di(tetraoxysilicate) dihydroxyl)
Hemimorphite (IMA1962 s.p., 1853) 9.BD.10    (IUPAC: tetrazinc heptaoxodisilicate dihydroxyl monohydrate)
Hemleyite (corundum: IMA2016-085) 9.0  [no] [no] (IUPAC: iron trioxysilicate)
Hemloite (IMA1987-015) 04.JB.60   
Hemusite (sphalerite: IMA1968-038) 2.CB.35a    (IUPAC: tetracopper(I) dicopper(II) tin molybdenum octasulfide)
Hendekasartorite (sartorite: IMA2015-075) 2.0  [no] [no] (Tl2Pb48As82S172)
Hendersonite (hewettite: IMA1967 s.p., 1962) 4.HG.50   
Hendricksite (mica: IMA1965-027) 9.EC.20    (IUPAC: potassium trizinc (aluminotrisilicate) decaoxydihydroxyl)
Heneuite (IMA1983-057) 8.BO.25    (IUPAC: calcium pentamagnesium hydro triphosphate carbonate)
Henmilite (IMA1981-050) 6.AC.30   (IUPAC: dicalcium copper tetrahydro di[tetrahydroborate])
Hennomartinite (lawsonite: IMA1992-033) 9.BE.05    (IUPAC: strontium dimanganese(III) heptaoxodisilicate dihydroxyl monohydrate)
Henritermierite (garnet, henritermierite: IMA1968-029) 9.AD.25    (IUPAC: tricalcium dimanganese(III) di(tetraoxysilicate) tetrahydroxyl)
Henryite (IMA1982-094) 2.BA.65    (with x ~ 0.40)
Henrymeyerite (hollandite, coronadite: IMA1999-016) 4.DK.05b    (IUPAC: barium (heptatitanium iron(II)) hexadecaoxide)
Hentschelite (IMA1985-057) 8.BB.40    (IUPAC: copper diiron(III) dihydro diphosphate)
Hephaistosite (IMA2006-043) 3.AA.60    (IUPAC: thallium dilead pentachloride)
Heptasartorite (sartorite: IMA2015-073) 2.0  [no] [no] (Tl7Pb22As55S108)
Herbertsmithite (atacamite: IMA2003-041) 3.DA.10c    (IUPAC: tricopper zinc hexahydro dichloride)
Hercynite (spinel, spinel: 1839) 4.BB.05    (IUPAC: iron(II) dialuminium tetraoxide)
Herderite (gadolinite, herderite: 1828) 8.BA.10    (IUPAC: calcium beryllium fluoro phosphate)
Hereroite (hereroite: IMA2011-027) 8.0  [no] 
Hermannjahnite (zinkosite: IMA2015-050) 7.0  [no] [no] (IUPAC: copper zinc disulfate)
Hermannroseite (adelite: IMA2010-006) 8.BH.35  [no]  (IUPAC: calcium copper hydro phosphate)
Herzenbergite (Y: 1935) 2.CD.05    (IUPAC: tin sulfide)
Hessite (Y: 1843) 2.BA.60    (IUPAC: disilver telluride)
Hetaerolite (spinel: 1877) 4.BB.10    (IUPAC: zinc dimanganese(III) tetraoxide)
Heterogenite ("O(OH)" group: IMA1967 s.p., 1872) 4.FE.20    (IUPAC: hydrocobalt(III) oxide)
HeteromorphiteI (plagionite: 1849) 2.HC.10c    (IUPAC: heptalead octaantimonide nonadecasulfide)
Heterosite (olivine: 1826) 8.AB.10    (IUPAC: iron(III) phosphate)
Heulandite (zeolitic tectosilicate) 9.GE.05
Heulandite-Ba (IMA2003-001) 9.GE.05    (zeolite family, chain of T10O20 tetrahedra)
Heulandite-Ca (IMA1997 s.p.) 9.GE.05    (zeolite family, chain of T10O20 tetrahedra)
Heulandite-K (IMA1997 s.p., 1822) 9.GE.05   [no] (zeolite family, chain of T10O20 tetrahedra)
Heulandite-Na (IMA1997 s.p.) 9.GE.05   [no] (zeolite family, chain of T10O20 tetrahedra)
Heulandite-Sr (IMA1997 s.p.) 9.GE.05   [no] (zeolite family, chain of T10O20 tetrahedra)
Hewettite (hewetite: 1914) 4.HE.15    (IUPAC: calcium hexavanadium(V) hexadecaoxide nonahydrate)
Hexacelsian (dmisteinbergite: IMA2015-045) 9.F?.  [no] [no] (IUPAC: barium (dialuminium octaoxydisilicate))
Hexaferrum (alloy: IMA1995-032) 1.AG.05   [no]
Hexahydrite (hexahydrite: 1911) 7.CB.25    (IUPAC: magnesium sulfate hexahydrate)
Hexahydroborite (IMA1977-015) 6.AC.25    (IUPAC: calcium di[tetrahydroborate] dihydrate)
Hexamolybdenum (alloy: IMA2007-029) 1.0   [no]
HexatestibiopanickeliteN (Y: 1974) 2.CC.30   
Hexathioplumbite (IMA2021-092) 7.JA.  [no] [no]
Heyerdahlite (astrophyllite: IMA2016-108) 9.D?.  [no] [no]
HeyiteQ (brackebuschite: IMA1971-042) 8.BK.20    Note, Uwe Kolitsch: it might be calderonite.
Heyrovskýite (lillianite: IMA1970-022) 2.JB.40b    (IUPAC: hexalead nonasulfa dibismuthide)
Hezuolinite (chevkinite: IMA2010-045) 9.BE.70  [no]

Hi – Hy 
Hiärneite (IMA1996-040) 4.DL.10   [no]
Hibbingite (atacamite: IMA1991-036) 3.DA.10a    (IUPAC: diiron(II) trihydroxide chloride)
Hibonite (magnetoplumbite: 1956) 4.CC.45   
Hidalgoite (alunite, beudantite: IMA1987 s.p., 1953 Rd) 8.BL.05    (IUPAC: lead trialuminium sulfate arsenate hexahydrate)
Hielscherite (ettringite: IMA2011-037) 7.0  [no] [no]
Hieratite (fluorosilicate: 1882) 3.CH.15    (IUPAC: dipotassium hexafluorosilicate)
Hilairite (hilairite: IMA1972-019) 9.DM.10    (IUPAC: disodium zircon nonaoxo trisilicate trihydrate)
Hilarionite (kaňkite: IMA2011-089) 8.0  [no] [no] (IUPAC: diiron(III) hydro sulfate arsenate hexahydrate)
Hilgardite (hilgardite: 1937) 6.ED.05    (IUPAC: dicalcium nonaoxo pentaborate monohydrate)
Hillebrandite (Y: 1908) 9.DG.40    (IUPAC: dicalcium trioxo silicate dihydroxyl)
Hillesheimite (günterblassite: IMA2011-080) 9.0  [no] [no]
Hillite (fairfieldite: IMA2003-005) 8.CG.05    (IUPAC: dicalcium zinc diphosphate dihydrate)
Hingganite (gadolinite) 9.AJ.20
Hingganite-(Ce) (IMA2004-004, 1987) 9.AJ.20    (IUPAC: cerium beryllium tetraoxysilicate hydroxyl)
Hingganite-(Nd) (IMA2019-028) 9.AJ.20  [no] [no]
Hingganite-(Y) (IMA1981-052) 9.AJ.20    (IUPAC: yttrium beryllium tetraoxysilicate hydroxyl)
Hingganite-(Yb) (IMA1982-041) 9.AJ.20    (IUPAC: ytterbium beryllium tetraoxysilicate hydroxyl)
Hinsdalite (alunite, beudandite: IMA1987 s.p., 1911 Rd) 8.BL.05    (IUPAC: lead trialuminium hexahydro sulfate phosphate)
Hiortdahlite (wöhlerite: IMA1987 s.p., 1890) 9.BE.17  [no] 
Hiortdahlite IIN (Y: 1988, 1890) 9.BE.17  [no] [no]
Hiroseite (perovskite: IMA2019-019) 9.0  [no] [no] (IUPAC: iron trioxy silicate)
Hisingerite (kaolinite: 1819) 09.ED.10   
Hitachiite (tetradymite: IMA2018-027) 2.0  [no] [no] (Pb5Bi2Te2S6)
Hizenite-(Y) (tengerite: IMA2011-030) 5.0  [no]  (IUPAC: dicalcium hexayttrium undecacarbonate tetradecahydrate)
Hjalmarite (amphibole: IMA2017-070) 9.D?.  [no] [no]
Hloušekite (lindackerite: IMA2013-048) 8.0  [no] [no]
Hocartite (stannite: IMA1967-046) 2.CB.15a    (IUPAC: disilver iron tin tetrasulfide)
Hochelagaite (IMA1983-088) 4.FM.15    (IUPAC: calcium tetraniobium undecaoxide octahydrate)
Hodgesmithite (ktenasite: IMA2015-112) 7.0  [no] [no] (IUPAC: hexa(copper,zinc) zinc decahydro disulfate trihydrate)
Hodgkinsonite (Y: 1913) 9.AE.20    (IUPAC: dizinc manganese tetraoxysilicate dihydroxyl)
Hodrušite (cuprobismutite: IMA1969-025) 2.JA.10c    (IUPAC: tetracopper hexabismuth undecasulfide)
Hoelite (Y: 1922) 10.CA.15    (IUPAC: 9,10-anthraquinone)
Hoganite (IMA2001-029) 10.AA.35    (IUPAC: copper diacetate monohydrate)
Hogarthite (lemoynite: IMA2009-043) 9.E?.  [no] [no]
Høgtuvaite (sapphirine: IMA1990-051) 9.DH.40   
Hohmannite (amarantite: 1888) 7.DB.30    (IUPAC: diiron(III) oxodisulfate octahydrate)
Holdawayite (IMA1986-001) 5.BA.20    (IUPAC: hexamanganese(VI) (chloro,hydro) dicarbonate heptahydro)
Holdenite (Y: 1927) 8.BE.55    (IUPAC: hexamanganese(II) trizinc diarsenate tetraoxysilicate octahydroxyl)
Holfertite (IMA2003-009) 4.GB.70    ((UO2)1.75Ca0.25TiO4·3H2O)
Hollandite (hollandite, coronadite: IMA2012 s.p., 1906 Rd) 4.DK.05a    (IUPAC: barium hexamanganese(IV) dimanganese(III) hexadecaoxide)
Hollingworthite (ullmannite: IMA1964-029) 2.EB.25    (IUPAC: rhodium arsenide sulfide)
Hollisterite (alloy: IMA2016-034) 1.0  [no] [no] (IUPAC: trialuminium iron alloy)
Holmquistite [Li-amphibole: IMA2012 s.p., IMA1997 s.p., 1913] 9.DD.05   
Holtedahlite (IMA1976-054) 8.BB.20    (IUPAC: dodecamagnesium hexa(hydro,oxo) (hydroxophosphate,carbonate) pentaphosphate)
Holtite (dumortierite: IMA1969-029 Rd) 9.AJ.10    ((Ta0.6☐0.4)Al6BSi3O18)
Holtstamite (garnet: IMA2003-047) 9.AD.25    (IUPAC: tricalcium dialuminium di(tetraoxysilicate) tetrahydroxyl)
Homilite (gadolinite: 1876) 9.AJ.20    (IUPAC: dicalcium iron(II) decaoxo diboro disilicate)
Honeaite (IMA2015-060) 2.0  [no] [no] (IUPAC: trigold thalium ditelluride)
Honessite (hydrotalcite, woodwardite: IMA1962 s.p., 1956) 7.DD.35   
Hongheite (vesuvianite: IMA2017-027) 9.B  [no] [no]
Hongshiite (alloy: IMA1988-xxx, 1974) 1.AG.45    (IUPAC: platinum copper alloy)
Honzaite (burgessite: IMA2014-105) 8.0  [no] [no] (IUPAC: dinickel dihydroxoarsenate pentawater)
Hopeite (hopeite: 1822) 8.CA.30    (IUPAC: trizinc diphosphate tetrahydrate)
Horákite (IMA2017-033) 8.0  [no] [no]
Hörnesite (vivianite: 1860) 8.CE.40    (IUPAC: trimagnesium diarsenate octahydrate)
Horomanite (IMA2007-037) 2.BB.    (IUPAC: hexairon trinickel octasulfide)
Horváthite-(Y) (IMA1996-032) 5.BD.25    (IUPAC: sodium yttrium difluoro carbonate)
Höslite (IMA2021-084) 8.DB.  [no] [no]
Hotsonite (IMA1983-033) 8.DF.05    (IUPAC: pentaluminium decahydro sulfate phosphate octahydrate)
Housleyite (IMA2009-024) 7.0  [no] [no] (Pb6CuTe4O18(OH)2)
Howardevansite (howardevansite: IMA1987-011) 8.AC.05    (IUPAC: sodium copper(II) diiron(III) trivanadate)
Howieite (IMA1964-017) 9.DH.65   
Howlite (Y: 1868) 6.CB.20    (IUPAC: dicalcium nonaoxo pentaboro silicate pentahydroxyl)
Hrabákite (hauchecornite: IMA2020-034)  [no] [no]
Hsianghualite (zeolitic tectosilicate: IMA1997 s.p., 1958) 9.GB.05    (IUPAC: dilithium tricalcium triberyllium tri(tetraoxosilicate) difluoride)
Huanghoite-(Ce) (IMA1967 s.p., 1961) 5.BD.35    (IUPAC: barium cerium fluoro dicarbonate)
Huangite (alunite, alunite: IMA1991-009) 7.BC.10   
Huanzalaite (wolframite: IMA2009-018) 4.DB.30  [no]  (IUPAC: magnesium tungstate)
Hubeite (IMA2000-022) 9.BJ.60   [no]
Hübnerite (wolframite: 1865) 4.DB.30    (IUPAC: manganese(II) tungstate)
Huemulite (decavanadate: IMA1965-012) 4.HG.10   
Huenite (IMA2015-122) 7.0  [no] [no] (IUPAC: tetracopper dihydro trimolybdate)
Hügelite (Y: 1913) 8.EC.15   
Hughesite (decavanadate: IMA2009-035a) 8.0  [no] 
Huizingite-(Al) (IMA2015-014) 7.0  [no] 
Hulsite (hulsite: 1908) 6.AB.45   
Humberstonite (IMA1967-015) 7.DG.10    (IUPAC: tripotassium heptasodium dimagnesium hexasulfate dinitrate hexahydrate)
Humboldtine (humboldtine: 1821) 10.AB.05    (IUPAC: iron(II) oxalate dihydrate)
Humite (humite: 1813) 9.AF.50    (IUPAC: heptamagnesium tri(tetraoxosilicate) di(fluoride,hydroxyl))
Hummerite (Y: 1951) 4.HC.10   
Hunchunite (alloy: IMA1991-033) 1.AA.25    (IUPAC: digold lead alloy)
Hundholmenite-(Y) (okanoganite: IMA2006-005) 9.AJ.35   [no] (IUPAC: magnesium pentaoxo tetraborate tetrahydro heptahydrate)
Hungchaoite (IMA1967 s.p., 1964) 6.DA.20   
Huntite (Y: 1953) 5.AB.25    (IUPAC: calcium trimagnesium tetracarbonate)
Hureaulite (IMA2007 s.p., 1825) 8.CB.10    (IUPAC: pentamanganese(II) di(hydroxophosphate) diphosphate tetrahydrate)
Hurlbutite (danburite: 1952) 8.AA.15    (IUPAC: calcium diberyllium diphosphate)
Hutcheonite (garnet, garnet: IMA2013-029) 9.AD.25  [no] [no] (IUPAC: tricalcium dititanium dodecaoxy dialuminosilicate)
Hutchinsonite (Y: 1905) 2.HD.45    (IUPAC: lead thallium pentarsenide nonasulfide)
Huttonite (monazite: 1951) 9.AD.35    (IUPAC: thorium tetraoxysilicate)
HyalophaneI (Y: 1855) 9.FA.30   
Hyalotekite (hyalotekite: 1877) 9.CH.05   
HydroastrophylliteN (astrophyllite: 2003) 9.DC.05   
Hydrobasaluminite (Y: 1948) 7.DE.60    (IUPAC: tetraluminium decahydro sulfate pentadecahydrate)
Hydrobiotite (corrensite: IMA1983 s.p., 1882 Rd) 9.EC.60    A 1:1 regular interstratification of biotite and vermiculite layers.
Hydroboracite (Y: 1834) 6.CB.15   
Hydrocalumite (hydrotalcite: 1934) 4.FL.10   
Hydrocerussite (Y: 1877) 5.BE.10    (IUPAC: trilead dihydro dicarbonate)
Hydrochlorborite (Y: 1965) 6.DA.30   
Hydrodelhayelite (IMA1979-023) 9.EB.10   
Hydrodresserite (dundasite: IMA1976-036) 5.DB.15    (IUPAC: barium dialuminium tetrahydro dicarbonate trihydrate)
Hydroglauberite (IMA1968-026) 7.CD.20    (IUPAC: decasodium tricalcium octasulfate hexahydrate)
Hydrohalite (Y: 1847) 3.BA.05    (IUPAC: sodium chloride dihydrate)
Hydrohalloysite (kaolinite: 1943) 9.ED.   [no]
Hydrohonessite (hydrotalcite, woodwardite: IMA1980-037a) 7.DD.35   
Hydrokenoelsmoreite (pyrochlore, elsmoreite: IMA2010 s.p., IMA2003-059 Rd) 4.DH.15   
Hydrokenomicrolite (pyrochlore, microlite: IMA2011-103) 4.D  [no] [no]
Hydrokenopyrochlore (pyrochlore, pyrochlore: IMA2017-005) 4.D  [no] [no]
Hydrokenoralstonite (pyrochlore: 1871) 3.CF.05   
Hydromagnesite (Y: 1828) 5.DA.05    (IUPAC: pentamagnesium dihydro tetracarbonate tetrahydrate)
Hydrombobomkulite (chalcoalumite: IMA1979-079a) 5.ND.15   
Hydroniumjarosite (alunite, alunite: IMA1987 s.p., 1960 Rd) 7.BC.10   
Hydroniumpharmacoalumite (pharmacosiderite: IMA2012-050) 8.D  [no] [no]
Hydroniumpharmacosiderite (pharmacosiderite: IMA2010-014) 8.DK.10  [no] 
Hydronováčekite (IMA2007 s.p., 1951) 8.EB.05  [no] [no] (IUPAC: magnesium diuranyl diarsenate dodecahydrate)
Hydropascoite (pascoite: IMA2016-032) 4.0  [no] [no]
Hydroplumboelsmoreite (jixianite, pyrochlore: IMA2021 s.p., IMA2013 s.p., IMA2010 s.p., IMA1984-062) 4.DH.15   
Hydropyrochlore (pyrochlore, pyrochlore: IMA2010 s.p., 1977 Rd) 4.DH.15   
Hydroredmondite (redmondite: IMA2021-073)  [no] [no]
Hydroromarchite ("O(OH)" group: IMA1969-007) 4.FF.05    (IUPAC: dihydrotritin(II) dioxide)
HydroscarbroiteQ (Y: 1960) 5.DA.35   
Hydrotalcite (hydrotalcite: 1842) 5.DA.50   
Hydroterskite (terskite: IMA2015-042) 4.0  [no] [no] (IUPAC: disodium dodecaoxy zirconhexasilicate hexahydroxyl)
Hydrotungstite (Y: 1944) 4.FJ.15    (IUPAC: tungsten dihydro dioxide monohydrate)
Hydrowoodwardite (hydrotalcite, woodwardite: IMA1996-038) 7.DD.35   
Hydroxyapophyllite-(K) (apophyllite: IMA2013 s.p., IMA1978 s.p.) 9.EA.15   
Hydroxycalciomicrolite (pyrochlore, microlite: IMA2013-073) 4.D  [no] [no] (IUPAC: pentadecacalcium ditantalum hexaoxo hydro)
Hydroxycalciopyrochlore (pyrochlore, pyrochlore: IMA2011-026) 4.D  [no] [no]
Hydroxycalcioroméite (pyrochlore, roméite: IMA2010 s.p., 1895 Rd) 4.D   
Hydroxycancrinite (cancrinite: IMA1990-014) 9.FB.05   
Hydroxyferroroméite (pyrochlore, roméite: IMA2016-006) 4.D  [no] [no]
Hydroxykenoelsmoreite (pyrochlore, elsmoreite: IMA2016-056) 4.D  [no] [no]
Hydroxykenomicrolite (pyrochlore, microlite: IMA2010 s.p., IMA1980-021 Rd) 4.DH.   
Hydroxykenopyrochlore (pyrochlore, pyrochlore: IMA2017-030a) 4.D  [no] [no]
Hydroxylapatite (apatite: IMA2010 s.p., 1856) 8.BN.05    (IUPAC: pentacalcium hydro triphosphate)
Hydroxylbastnäsite (bastnäsite) 5.BD.20a (IUPAC: REE hydrocarbonate)
Hydroxylbastnäsite-(Ce) (IMA1987 s.p., 1964) 5.BD.20a   
Hydroxylbastnäsite-(La) (1986, IMA2021-001) 5.BD.20a   [no]
Hydroxylbastnäsite-(Nd) (IMA1984-060) 5.BD.20a   
Hydroxylborite (IMA2005-054) 6.AB.50    (IUPAC: trimagnesium trihydro borate)
Hydroxylchondrodite (humite: IMA2010-019) 9.AF.45  [no]  (IUPAC: pentamagnesium di(tetraoxysilicate) dihydroxyl)
Hydroxylclinohumite (humite: IMA1998-065) 9.AF.55   [no] (IUPAC: nonamagnesium tetra(tetraoxysilicate) dihydroxyl)
Hydroxyledgrewite (humite: IMA2011-113) 9.AF.  [no] [no] (IUPAC: nonacalcium tetra(tetraoxysilicate) dihydroxyl)
Hydroxylellestadite (apatite: IMA2010 s.p., IMA1970-026) 9.AH.25   
Hydroxylgugiaite (melilite: IMA2016-009) 9.B?.  [no] [no]
Hydroxylhedyphane (apatite: IMA2018-052) 8.BN.  [no] [no] (IUPAC: dicalcium trilead hydro triarsenate)
Hydroxylherderite (gadolinite: IMA2007 s.p., 1894) 8.BA.10    (IUPAC: calcium beryllium hydro phosphate)
Hydroxylpyromorphite (apatite: IMA2017-075) 8.0  [no] [no] (IUPAC: pentalead hydro triphosphate)
Hydroxylwagnerite (wagnerite: IMA2004-009) 8.BB.15  [no] [no] (IUPAC: dimagnesium hydro phosphate)
Hydroxymanganopyrochlore (pyrochlore, pyrochlore: IMA2012-005) 4.D  [no] 
Hydroxymcglassonite-(K) (apophyllite: IMA2020-066) 9.0  [no] [no]
Hydroxynatropyrochlore (pyrochlore, pyrochlore: IMA2017-074) 4.D  [no] [no]
Hydroxyplumbopyrochlore (pyrochlore: IMA2018-145) 4.0  [no] [no]
Hydrozincite (Y: 1853) 5.BA.15    (IUPAC: pentazinc hexahydro dicarbonate)
Hylbrownite (kanonerovite: IMA2010-054) 8.FC.  [no] [no]
Hypercinnabar (IMA1977-D) 2.CD.15b    (IUPAC: mercury sulfide)
Hyršlite (sartorite: IMA2016-097) 2.0  [no] [no] (Pb8As10Sb6S32)
Hyttsjöite (IMA1993-056) 9.EG.60   [no]

External links
IMA Database of Mineral Properties/ RRUFF Project
Mindat.org - The Mineral Database
Webmineral.com
Mineralatlas.eu minerals H